Faysal Aziz Khan (born 2 April 1974), is an  investigative journalist from Pakistan. He is currently serving as President & Chief News Officer for Bol Media Group and hosts a current affairs talk show Ab Baat Hogi on Bol News. He also serves as Strategic Advisor to President of Pakistan Arif Alvi on PIAIC.

Early life

Faysal was born in Sukkur, Sindh, Pakistan, into a Yusufzai Pathan family to Abdul Qayyum Khan, a government officer. Faysal graduated in 1993 with a bachelor's degree in Science at the University of Karachi, followed by a master's degree in Economics in 1995 then second master's degree in International Relations in 1997 at the University of Karachi. He is fluent in speaking English, Urdu and Sindhi language.

Career

Faysal started his career in 1996 as a correspondent for Urdu language newspaper Daily Nawa-e-Waqt. In 1998 he joined Daily Jang served as staff reporter, in 2002 he joined Geo News as youngest Bureau Chief, where he worked for 12 years. While working for Geo News as investigative journalist he published about large-scale special investigative report named as Kala Budget (Black Budget) of Karachi in 2013 which revealed that Rs. 830 million have been looted from residents of Karachi city by illegal activities, money laundering and corruption. In 2014 he joined Bol News as president and later became Chief News Officer for Bol Media Group He presently hosts a current affairs talk show Ab Baat Hogi  on Bol News.

Honors and awards

Faysal has spent 25 years journalism thus he has recognized by mentioned below awards.

 1999 – Best Reporter Award by Karachi Union of Journalist 
 2002 – Best IT Journalist Award by ITCN, Singapore 
 2011 – Pakistan Media Award by Association of Television Journalist 
 2013 – Best Investigative Journalism by Pakistan Media Awards
 2017 – Pakistan Excellence Award by Execllence Club of Pakistan

See also
 List of Pakistani journalists
 Bol Network
 Geo News

References

External links
 
 Faysal Aziz Khan at Bol News

1974 births
Living people
Pakistani columnists
Pakistani male journalists
Sindhi people
Pakistani television talk show hosts
Journalists from Karachi
Geo News newsreaders and journalists
University of Karachi alumni
Urdu-language columnists
People from Sukkur District